The 2003 FIA GT Brno 500 km was the fourth round the 2003 FIA GT Championship.  It took place at the Brno Circuit, Czech Republic, on 25 May 2003.

Official results
Class winners in bold.  Cars failing to complete 70% of winner's distance marked as Not Classified (NC).

† – #8 Graham Nash Motorsport was disqualified for failing post-race technical inspection.  The car was found to have a fuel tank larger than regulations allowed.

Statistics
 Pole position – #2 Konrad Motorsport – 1:56.695
 Fastest lap – #2 Konrad Motorsport – 1:59.171
 Average speed – 155.140 km/h

References

 
 
 

B
FIA GT